The following highways are numbered 425:

Canada
Manitoba Provincial Road 425
New Brunswick Route 425
Newfoundland and Labrador Route 425

Japan
 Japan National Route 425

United States
  Interstate 425 (former)
  U.S. Route 425
  Florida State Road 425
  County Road 425 (Seminole County, Florida)
  Kentucky Route 425
  Louisiana Highway 425 (former)
  Maryland Route 425
  Nevada State Route 425
  New York State Route 425
  Pennsylvania Route 425
  Puerto Rico Highway 425
 Texas:
  Texas State Highway Loop 425 (former)
  Texas State Highway Spur 425 (former)
  Texas Farm to Market Road 425
 Virginia State Route 425 (former)